Lynwood is a village in Cook County, Illinois, United States and a suburb of Chicago. The population was 9,116 at the 2020 census.

Lynwood was founded in 1959. The village is bordered by Lansing to the north, Glenwood to the west, Ford Heights and Sauk Village to the south, and Munster and Dyer, Indiana, to the east. The Indiana state line borders the entire eastern edge of Lynwood. Lynwood is currently a mix of suburban neighborhoods with a substantial amount of remaining farmland.

Geography
Lynwood is located at  (41.526351, -87.548194).

Surrounding areas
 Lansing 
 Glenwood    Munster
  Glenwood   Munster / Dyer
 Ford Heights    Sauk Village
 Sauk Village

Demographics
As of the 2020 census there were 9,116 people, 3,052 households, and 2,253 families residing in the village. The racial makeup of the village was 75.95% African American, 13.95% White, 0.43% Native American, 0.47% Asian, 0.01% Pacific Islander, 3.70% from other races, and 5.48% from two or more races. Hispanic or Latino of any race were 8.25% of the population.

There were 3,052 households, out of which 48.89% had children under the age of 18 living with them, 40.96% were married couples living together, 31.26% had a female householder with no husband present, and 26.18% were non-families. 22.35% of all households were made up of individuals, and 11.63% had someone living alone who was 65 years of age or older. The average household size was 3.63 and the average family size was 3.02.

The village's age distribution consisted of 23.5% under the age of 18, 13.3% from 18 to 24, 21.9% from 25 to 44, 30% from 45 to 64, and 11.3% who were 65 years of age or older. The median age was 38.4 years. For every 100 females, there were 83.5 males. For every 100 females age 18 and over, there were 78.7 males.

The median income for a household in the village was $76,154, and the median income for a family was $101,935. Males had a median income of $51,774 versus $36,304 for females. The per capita income for the village was $31,039. About 4.0% of families and 7.1% of the population were below the poverty line, including 8.8% of those under age 18 and 14.2% of those age 65 or over.

Note: the US Census treats Hispanic/Latino as an ethnic category. This table excludes Latinos from the racial categories and assigns them to a separate category. Hispanics/Latinos can be of any race.

Government
Lynwood is in Illinois's 2nd congressional district and the village mayor is Jada Curry. The police chief is Dan Dempsy and the fire chief is Keenan Newton.

References

External links

 
Chicago metropolitan area
Villages in Cook County, Illinois
Villages in Illinois
Populated places established in 1959
1959 establishments in Illinois
Majority-minority cities and towns in Cook County, Illinois